Aparecida do Taboado is a municipality located in the Brazilian state of Mato Grosso do Sul. Its population was 26,069 (2020) and its area is 2,750 km².

References

Municipalities in Mato Grosso do Sul